Styled By Neha is an Indian reality-television series on Fox Life about various dressing codes and styles across the Indian subcontinent and also from in or around the world.

The series features Neha Dhupia (Indian actress), Diva Dhawan and Elton Fernandez as show's main hosts.

See also
Style By Jury

References

Indian reality television series
2018 Indian television series debuts
Fox Life